Live in London is a live concert recording of George Michael's final two concerts in London's Earls Court on 24 and 25 August 2008 as part of his 25 Live tour. This is the first live DVD of George Michael's career. It was released on DVD (two discs release) and Blu-ray (one BD with DTS-HD Master Audio and Dolby Digital 5.1 multichannel sound) formats on 7 December 2009 in the UK, Europe and Australia, and on 8 December 2009 in the US and Canada.

The DVD had subtitles for spoken portions of the DVD in several languages. The highly anticipated shows on the DVD marked the end of George Michael's triumphant 25 Live Tour and were the last chance to catch Michael performing on a stage of this magnitude in London.

Background information
In 2006, George Michael announced his first tour in 15 years, 25 Live. This DVD was recorded and filmed on 24 and 25 August 2008 when George Michael declared two special performances entitled "The Final Two" which took place in Earls Court, London. Moreover, another "final" concerts were announced in Copenhagen and Abu Dhabi. Those concerts were the last extensive touring that was performed by George Michael. The concert set list is a bit different from earlier in the tour. The DVD was recorded in the latter part of the tour, which had a very different set list. Earlier in the tour, the set list was vastly different. Since most artists record the last (or last couple of) show(s) on a tour, the set list can change over the course of the tour. The DVD reflects the final set list later used in the "Finals" concerts in Abu Dhabi, Australia, etc. The DVD is a mesh of the last two shows at Earl's Court. The viewer can see a few of the differences between the two nights (example: the Congo player changes between two different men during "Too Funky"). The viewer can also see different places George is standing from shot to shot (as in the extended part of "Fastlove", once on the main stage, then a second later at the end of the catwalk stage extension, and during the intro of "Outside", once waiting behind the LED stage wall to open for George to walk through, then moments later he enters the stage from the right side, not using the door in the LED wall).

Track listing

Disc 1
"Waiting (Reprise)" (Michael)
"Fastlove" (Michael/Rushen/Douglas)
"I'm Your Man" (Michael)
"Flawless (Go to the City)" (Michael/Alexander/Wooden/Turnier/Matthew/Stumm)
"Father Figure" (Michael)
"You Have Been Loved" (Michael/Austin)
"An Easier Affair" (Michael/Cushnan/Ambrose/Flynn)
"Everything She Wants" (Michael)
"One More Try" (Michael)
"A Different Corner" (Michael)
"Too Funky" (Michael)
"Shoot the Dog" (Michael/Oakey/Burden)
"John and Elvis Are Dead" (Michael/Austin)
"Faith" (Michael)
"Spinning the Wheel" (Michael/Douglas)
"Feeling Good" (Bricusse/Newley)
"Roxanne" (Sting)
"My Mother Had a Brother" (Michael)
"Amazing" (Michael/Douglas)
"Fantasy" (Michael)
"Outside" (Michael)
"Careless Whisper" (Michael/Ridgeley)
"Freedom! '90" (Michael)

Disc 2
This disc contains the following bonus features:
Documentaries
"I'd Know Him a Mile Off!"
Produced by Lisa Johnson, Filmed and directed by David Austin. Made by G K Panayioutou.
Bonus tracks:
"Precious Box" (Michael)
"Jesus to a Child" (Michael)
"The First Time Ever I Saw Your Face" (McCall)

Credits
 George Michael – vocals
 Chris Cameron – musical director, keyboards, arranger
 Danny Cummings – percussion
 Lea Mullen – percussion
 Phil Palmer – guitars
 Andy Hamilton – sax, keyboards, EWI
 Steve Walters – bass
 Mike Brown – guitars
 Carlos Hercules – drums
 Graham Kearns – guitars
 Luke Smith – keyboards
 Shirley Lewis – backing vocals
 Jay Henry – backing vocals
 Lincoln Jean-Marie – backing vocals
 Lori Perry – backing vocals
 Sharon Perry – backing vocals
 Lucy Jules – backing vocals

Weekly charts

Certifications and sales

References

External links
George Michael's official website
Music2nite Blogspot
George Michael Tour Archive

George Michael albums
Concert films
2009 video albums
2009 live albums
Live video albums